Loloan Malays or Balinese Malays (Malay: Melayu Loloan; Jawi: ملايو لولون) are a sub-ethnic group of the  Malay who've lived in Loloan, Jembrana, Bali, Indonesia since the 17th century. There are approximately 28,000 up to 65,000 Loloan Malays living in Bali.

The Loloan Malays are predominantly Muslim, which is distinguished from the majority Balinese ethnic group who are predominantly Hindu.

See also

Malays (ethnic group)

References

Indigenous peoples of Southeast Asia
Ethnic groups in Indonesia
Muslim communities of Indonesia
Malay people
Jembrana Regency